The River Line was a Conrail rail line located between Jersey City, New Jersey and Selkirk, New York, running along the west side of the Hudson Palisades and, after passing through a tunnel at Haverstraw, New York, along the west bank of the Hudson River. It was previously the New York Central's West Shore Railroad and Weehawken Branch. The River Line has since been split into several sections, following the 1999 division of Conrail assets between Norfolk Southern Railway and CSX Transportation.

The majority of the line is now the CSX River Subdivision, which runs from Control Point 2 (CP2) at the North Bergen Yard in North Bergen, New Jersey to Selkirk. The portion south of CP2, including the Weehawken Tunnel, is now part of NJ Transit's Hudson–Bergen Light Rail. Freight trains continuing south of CP2 now use the Northern Running Track, a portion of a former Erie Railroad line that has been upgraded to handle the traffic. At Selkirk, the River Subdivision ends at the Castleton Subdivision, with the Port Subdivision continuing towards Albany. The Castleton Sub was built in 1924 as part of a bypass for through freight trains around Albany.

Conrail's defunct River Line and Weehawken Branch

The River Line began at CP Waldo, at a junction with the Passaic and Harsimus Line (P&H). The P&H Line runs west through what was the Pennsylvania Railroad's Bergen Hill Cut, just north of PATH, through a re-aligned Marion Junction.

At CP Nave, the River Line junctioned with the National Docks Secondary, which still runs south on the east side of the Hudson Palisades, with the Nave-Croxton Running Track running west through the old Erie Railroad's  Long Dock Tunnel. The junction only allowed trains coming to/from the south on the National Docks to continue to/from the north on the River Line.

North of CP Nave, the River Line entered Hoboken; it is now used for the Hudson-Bergen Light Rail (HBLR) north of this point. The HBLR runs around the west and north sides of Hoboken and into Weehawken, where it turns west through a tunnel to CSX's North Bergen Yard, originally part of the New York Central's West Shore Railroad.

From that point north, the River Line is still in use, but as CSX as the River Subdivision, north toward Albany, New York.

The Weehawken Branch was just east of the River Line, from somewhere in Jersey City north of CP Nave to Baldwin Avenue in Weehawken. It was operated by Conrail as a second track of the River Line.

The River Line was abandoned east and south of the Tonnelle Avenue overpass at the North Bergen yard. The short connection between the National Docks Secondary and the River Line was also abandoned, as was the Weehawken Branch.

History
The first bit of the River Line, splitting from the P&H Line and passing over the National Docks, was built fairly-recently as a connecting track. North of there, the line was the New Jersey Junction Railroad to the Weehawken tunnel. Through the tunnel, it was the West Shore Railroad. Both of these lines were owned by the New York Central Railroad.

The Weehawken Branch was built and owned by the Erie Railroad. It originally passed through the middle of Hoboken, but was later realigned to the west side, right next to the New Jersey Junction Railroad.

References

External links
STB - CSX Discontinuance Exemption AB-55 584X
STB - Conrail Abandonment of the Weehawken Branch AB-167 766N
STB - NS Discontinuance Exemption AB-290 212X
January 15, 1998 Conrail River Line timetable
Route description NB to Newburgh

Rail infrastructure in New Jersey
Rail infrastructure in New York (state)
Transportation in Hudson County, New Jersey